Copland may refer to:
 Copland (crater), on Mercury
 Copland (operating system)
 Copland (surname)
 Copland River in New Zealand
 4532 Copland, an asteroid named after Aaron Copland
 Aaron Copland, American composer

See also 
 Copeland (disambiguation)
 Cop Land, a 1997 movie starring Sylvester Stallone, Robert De Niro and Harvey Keitel